Junaid Ali (born 6 December 1995) is a Pakistani first-class cricketer who plays for Central Punjab.

References

External links
 

1995 births
Living people
Pakistani cricketers
Central Punjab cricketers
Lahore cricketers
Khan Research Laboratories cricketers
Cricketers from Lahore